The following lists events that happened in 2014 in the Republic of the Union of Myanmar.

Incumbents
 President: Thein Sein 
 First Vice President: Sai Mauk Kham 
 Second Vice President: Nyan Tun

Events

January
 January 14- Myanmar host the 2014 ASEAN Para Games for first time.
 January 14 - A Thailand-based women's rights group accuses Myanmar of using rape as a weapon of war.

March
 March 28 - Buddhist mobs in western Myanmar reportedly target foreign aid groups and workers in reaction to supposedly disrespectful treatment of a Buddhist flag.

September
 September 28 - A Buddhist monk accused of inciting violence against Muslims in Burma says he is joining forces with the Bodu Bala Sena group in Sri Lanka in order to combat a "serious threat from jihadist groups".

References

 
Burma
Years of the 21st century in Myanmar
Burma
2010s in Myanmar